This is a list of conflicts involving Moldova.

Moldova
 
Wars